Kigilyakh or kisiliyakh (meaning "stone person") are tall, pillar-like natural rock formations looking like tall monoliths standing more or less isolated. Usually they are composed of granite or sandstone shaped as a result of cryogenic weathering. Most kigilyakhs formed during the Cretaceous period and are about 120 million years old.

Cultural significance and etymology
These anthropomorphic rock pillars are an important feature in Yakut culture. Often they are slightly scattered, protruding from the surface of smooth mountains and giving the impression of a standing crowd of people. According to Yakut legends kigilyakhs originated in very ancient people.

The Yakut word "kisiliy" means "a place where there are people". Kisilyakh means "mountain having a man" or "mountain married". The term "kigilyakh" is a distorted form of the original Yakut "kisilyakh".

Locations
Such stones are found in different places of Sakha (Yakutia), Russia, mainly in the East Siberian Lowland:

Alazeya Plateau
Anabar Plateau
Kigilyakh Peninsula, with Mount Kigilyakh and Cape Kigilyakh, Bolshoy Lyakhovsky Island, New Siberian Islands
Kisilyakh Range, part of the Chersky Range
Kyun-Tas
Chetiryokhstolbovoy Island, Medvezhyi Islands, East Siberian Sea
New Siberian Islands
Oymyakon Highlands
Polousny Range 
Stolbovoy Island, Laptev Sea
Suor Uyata range 
Ulakhan Sis

Outside of Yakutia, similar formations are found in the island of Popova-Chukchina and the Putorana Plateau, in Krasnoyarsk Krai.

History
Ferdinand Wrangel reported on the kigilyakhs on Chetyryokhstolbovoy, an island of the Medvezhyi Islands in the East Siberian Sea. He visited the island during his 1821-1823 expedition and named it after them (Chetyryokhstolbovoy meaning "four pillars").

In Soviet times on the Kigilyakh Peninsula at the western end of Bolshoy Lyakhovsky Island, one of the New Siberian Islands, Vladimir Voronin, then in charge of the Polar station on the island, was shown a large standing rock which had been heavily eroded and which gave its name to the peninsula.

See also
 Monolith
 Pinnacle (geology)
 Baydzharakh

References

Further reading
Vladimir Gorbatovsky, Сакральные места России (Sacred places of Russia)
R. Ageeva, Камень и горы в народной культуре (Stones and mountains in folk culture)

External links

Russian propaganda: Sacred anthropomorphic kigilyakh megaliths in northern Yakutia 
Yakutia – Russian Easter Island
Protected Areas in the Russian Arctic
Unknown landscapes of the planet. New photo expedition project. Yakutia.
Якутия.Фото - Священные Киhиляхи в Верхоянском районе. Зимой / Ancient Siberian stones in Verkhoyansk Mountains. Winter (27 фотографий / 27 photos)
Natural monoliths
Rock formations of Russia
Yakut culture